Benfield School is a  coeducational secondary school and sixth form located in Walkergate, Newcastle upon Tyne, England. There is an ongoing consultation to close Benfield Sixth Form from September 2023.

Its pupils come from a large area of Newcastle's East and West ends including Byker, Heaton, Walker, Walkergate, Benwell and other areas in the West of Newcastle Upon Tyne.

Benfield was first opened in 1967 as one of the first purpose-built comprehensive schools in England, and over the years has built up a reputation as a sports college. The school is also the North of England gymnastics centre and has all-weather floodlit football, rugby and basketball pitches, badminton courts along with ordinary pitches, tennis courts and a swimming pool.

Previously a foundation school administered by Newcastle City Council, in May 2017 Benfield School  converted to academy status. The school is now sponsored by the NEAT Academy Trust.

Facilities 
Benfield School is renowned locally and regionally for its sport and creative arts facilities. Below are a number of examples of the facilities available at the school to students and the community:-
 Swimming Pool - 20m x 9m Swimming Pool with swimming a part of the curriculum offer for students.
 Floodlit 3G Pitch - which supports the work of the Benfield Elite Football Academy.
 Gymnastics Centre - 2336 square meters of floor gymnastics space.
 Staged Drama and Dance Studio - a versatile performance space with light rigging in place with two fixed stages.

Alumni
Lee Hall (playwright), English playwright and screenwriter most famous for his Academy Award-nominated screenplay for the 1999 film Billy Elliot. Hall also wrote the screenplay for the 2019 biopic Rocketman which documents the life of Sir Elton John. His lyrics appear on Elton John's 2004 album Peachtree Road which includes 'The Letter' 'Electricity' and 'Merry Christmas Maggie Thatcher'.

Steve Bruce, Former Newcastle United Football Manager (2019-2021) and former footballer 

Lee Clark, English football manager and former footballer 

David Nellist, Actor - known for starring in Sherlock and 55 Degrees North

Trevor Fox, Actor - known for starring in Billy Elliot and Bridget Jones Diary

Vineeta Rishi, Actress know for starring in Line of Duty, Doctor Who and Holby City -

References

External links
 Official website

Secondary schools in Newcastle upon Tyne
Academies in Newcastle upon Tyne